Risga is an uninhabited island in between Càrna and Oronsay, in the centre of Loch Sunart, about  from the north shore, in the council area of Highland, Scotland. In 1950, over 50 pairs of Lesser black-backed gull were recorded. The island is included in the grounds of Glenborrodale Castle and is part of Sunart SSSI. Risga has at least 60 crotagans along the east coast, used for fishing. Risga is a rocky island.

History 
The name "Risga" is Norse and includes the Old Norse word for island. In 1920–21 some Mesolithic materials were recovered during the excavation of a kitchen. They are now in the Hunterian Museum, University of Glasgow and Kelvingrove Art Gallery and Museum. There is a shell midden, a scheduled monument that is at least , which is visible as a grass-covered mound. The shell heap is on top of a raised beach, similar to those at Oronsay.

References

External links
 

Uninhabited islands of Highland (council area)